is a town in Saitama Prefecture, Japan. , the town had an estimated population of 32,851 in 14,689 households and a population density of 510 persons per km².

Geography
Located in northwestern Saitama Prefecture, Yorii is on the central reaches of the Arakawa River, just downstream of Nagatoro, and is approximately 70 kilometers from downtown Tokyo.

Surrounding municipalities
Saitama Prefecture
 Fukaya
 Misato
 Ranzan
 Ogawa
 Minano
 Nagatoro
 Higashichichibu

Climate
Yorii has a humid subtropical climate (Köppen Cfa) characterized by warm summers and cool winters with light to no snowfall.  The average annual temperature in Ageo is 13.4 °C. The average annual rainfall is 1746 mm with September as the wettest month. The temperatures are highest on average in August, at around 24.9 °C, and lowest in January, at around 2.2 °C.

Demographics
Per Japanese census data, the population of Yorii peaked around the year 2000 and had declined since.

History
Yorii developed as a post station on the pilgrimage route to the temples of the Chichibu area from the Kamakura period, and was a castle town to Hachigata Castle during the Sengoku period. The town of Yorii was created within Hanzawa District, Saitama with the establishment of the modern municipalities system on April 1, 1889. Hanzawa District was abolished in 1896, becoming part of Ōsato District. 

In February 1955, the town expanded by annexing the neighboring villages of Orihara, Hachigata, Obusuma, and Yodo.

Government
Yorii has a mayor-council form of government with a directly elected mayor and a unicameral town council of 16 members. Yorii, together with the town of Misato and city of Fukaya, contributes three members to the Saitama Prefectural Assembly. In terms of national politics, the town is part of Saitama 11th district of the lower house of the Diet of Japan.

Economy
Honda has an automobile assembly plant in Yorii, which is a major local employer.

Education
Yorii has six public elementary schools and three public middle schools operated by the town government, and one public high school operated by the Saitama Prefectural Board of Education.

Transportation

Railway
 Chichibu Railway - Chichibu Main Line
 –  – 
 Tobu Railway – Tōbu Tōjō Line
 –  -  - | - 
 JR East – Hachikō Line
 -  -

Highway

Sister city relations
  Marysville, Ohio since 2013.

Local attractions
Hachigata Castle
Saitama Museum of Rivers
Tamayodo Dam
Tsuburada Dam

Noted people from Yorii
Chizuru Arai, Olympic gold medal judoka
Kazuichi Hanawa, Mangaka

References

External links

Official Website 

Towns in Saitama Prefecture
Yorii, Saitama